Léon Deschamps (1864 – 28 December 1899) was a French novelist and poet, most notable as the founder of the La Plume literary review.

1864 births
1899 deaths
19th-century French poets
19th-century French novelists
French male poets
French male novelists
Members of the Ligue de la patrie française
19th-century French male writers